The 2015 Nepal National League also known as the RedBull National League for sponsorship reasons is the 2nd edition of Nepal National League. The winners Three Star Club received 1 Crore or 10,000,000 rupees ($149,278 USD).

Red Bull energy drink is the main sponsor. San Miguel Beer is also a co-sponsor of the competition.

The League featured 9 teams from Kathmandu and the rest of Nepal.

The League was heavily affected by the April 2015 Nepal earthquake, with play being suspended from late April and due to resume in September.

Teams
A total of 9 teams featured in the league. The teams are Nepal Police Club, Nepal Army Club, Manang Marshyangdi Club, Nepal APF, Three Star Club, Far Western FC, Morang XI, Lumbini FC, and Jhapa XI. Machhindra Football Club, Himalayan Sherpa Club, Saraswoti Youth Club and Friends Club became unable to take part due to the ban by ANFA Makwanpur DFA were supposed to take part in the league but where disqualified for not filling out the required entries, while Sankata Boys Sports Club had earlier pulled out.

Stadia and locations

Remarks:
1 Dasarath Rangasala Stadium was heavily damaged due to the April 2015 Nepal earthquake.
2 Matches shifted to ANFA Complex due to violent protests in the region.

Personnel and sponsoring

Managerial changes

League table

Results

Matches

Round 1

Round 2

Round 3

Round 4

Round 5

Round 6

Round 7

Round 8

League resumption

Round 9

Round 10

Round 11

Round 12

Round 13

Round 14

Season statistics

Top goalscorers

Hat-tricks

Own Goals

Awards

All Nepal Football Association awarded the following awards for the National League season.
 Best goalkeeper : Kiran Chemjong (Three Star Club)
 Best defender : Devendra Tamang (Jhapa XI)
 Best midfielder : Bishal Rai (Manang Marshyangdi Club)
 Best forward : Nawayug Shrestha (Nepal Army Club)
 Best coach : Rajendra Tamang (Three Star Club)

Controversy
The conditions of many stadiums has been heavily criticized as many; including the national stadium, are in poor condition.

Some Jhapa XI fans were left feeling aggrieved after the venue was moved from Chandragadhi, where there was a well maintained stadium to the Domalal Stadium in Birtamod, which is smaller but in a more central location.

It was initially decided that matches would only be played on weekends so teams had adequate rest time and venues wouldn't be overused, but the ANFA decided to revert this decision and schedule matches one after the other, which vexed many team officials and supporters. Nepal Army Club coach Megraj KC publicly criticized the cramped schedules saying that they would hurt team performances.

Jhapa XI were unable to train on a proper pitch before an away match against Nepal Police Club on 3 April. Instead of being allowed to train in the Police Club's Dasarath Stadium they were instead made to train on the Tudhikhel grounds, whose surface is composed of sand and rocks not grass and is not a proper football pitch. Jhapa coach Bhagirath Ale publicly criticized the ANFA for refusing to grant them permission to train at the national stadium, although he stated that the improper practice session would not have an effect on Jhapa's performance against the police club.

Effects of the April earthquake and subsequent May aftershock on league play

Following the 25 April the National League was immediately suspended by the ANFA as the Country was in a State of emergency. Many of the venues were damaged. The Dasarath Rangasala Stadium, which was already in poor shape and in need of repair before the earthquake was rendered completely unplayable as it sustained severe damaged to the stands, grounds, and many of the walls surrounding the stadium collapsed. Following the quake and subsequent aftershock the vast majority of players and staff of the respective teams took time off to help, Bikram Lama spent time delivery relief supplies in Sindhupalchowk for example, and many charitable matches and tournaments were also held to raise awareness and money.

On 8 July the ANFA announced that the National League would resume in mid September.

Prizes
The winning club will receive 1 Crore while the runners up 50 Lakhs and the third place team is set to receive 25 Lakhs. The fourth placed will get 15Lakhs and 5th place will get 7 Lakhs Coaches and players who are the recipients of individual awards will each be gifted a motorbike.

References

Nepal National League seasons
1
1
Football in Nepal